Yacht rock (originally known as the West Coast sound or adult-oriented rock) is a broad music style and aesthetic commonly associated with soft rock, one of the most commercially successful genres from the mid-1970s to the mid-1980s. Drawing on sources such as smooth soul, smooth jazz, R&B, and disco, common stylistic traits include high-quality production, clean vocals, and a focus on light, catchy melodies. Its name, coined in 2005 by the makers of the online video series Yacht Rock, was derived from its association with the popular Southern Californian leisure activity of sailing.

Definition

The term "yacht rock" did not exist contemporaneously with the music the term describes, from about 1975 to 1984. It refers to "adult-oriented rock" or "West Coast Sound", which became identified with yacht rock in 2005, when the term was coined in J. D. Ryznar et al.'s online video series of the same name. Understood as a pejorative term, "yacht rock" referred, in part, to a stereotypical yuppie yacht owner enjoying smooth music while sailing. Many "yacht rockers" included nautical references in their lyrics, videos and album artwork, exemplified by Christopher Cross's anthemic track, "Sailing" (1979). Long mocked for "its saccharine sincerity and garish fashion", the original stigma attached to the music has lessened since about 2015.

In 2014, AllMusic's Matt Colier identified the "key defining rules of the genre":

 "keep it smooth, even when it grooves, with more emphasis on the melody than on the beat"
 "keep the emotions light, even when the sentiment turns sad (as is so often the case in the world of the sensitive yacht-rocksman)"
 "always keep it catchy, no matter how modest or deeply buried in the tracklist the tune happens to be."

The "exhilaration of escape" is "essential to yacht", according to journalist and documentary-film maker Katie Puckrik. She quoted the lyrics of Cross's "Ride Like the Wind" (1979), "to make it to the border of Mexico", as an example of the aspirational longing that demonstrates "the power of the genre". Thwarted desire is another key element that counters the "feelgood bounce" of yacht in the same song. Puckrik identified a sub-genre, "dark yacht", exemplified in Joni Mitchell's "accidental yacht rock" song "The Hissing of the Summer Lawns" (1975), which described the "tarnished love" of "a woman trapped in a big house and a loveless marriage".

According to Mara Schwartz Kuge, who worked in the L.A. music industry for two decades, "Soft rock was a genre of very popular pop music from the '70s and early '80s, characterized by soft, mostly acoustic guitars and slow-to-mid tempos ... most people have generalized the term to mean anything kind of soft-and-'70s-ish, including artists like Rupert Holmes. Not all yacht rock is soft, either: Toto's 'Hold the Line' and Kenny Loggins' 'Footloose' are both very yacht rock but not soft rock."

Comprehensively defining yacht rock remains difficult, despite agreement that its central elements are "aspirational but not luxurious, jaunty but lonely, pained but polished". Journalist Jack Seale stated that, as in other "micro-genres", certain albums of artists who are accepted as proponents are "arbitrarily ruled in or out". For example, Michael Jackson's Thriller (1982) is accepted as yacht rock, but Fleetwood Mac's Rumours (1977) is not.

Yacht Rock creators
Yacht Rock web series co-creators Ryznar, Steve Huey, Hunter Stair, and David Lyons have attempted to apply precision to what is defined as yacht rock, and have been critical of overly expansive definitions of the term. In 2016 they invented the term "nyacht rock" to refer to songs that have sometimes been classified as yacht rock but that they felt did not fit the definition. On their podcasts Beyond Yacht Rock and Yacht or Nyacht?, they have ranked various songs as being either within or outside of the genre.

Factors that the four list as relevant to yacht rock include:
 High production value
 Use of "elite" Los Angeles-based studio musicians and producers associated with yacht rock
 Jazz and R&B influences
 Use of electric piano
 Complex and wry lyrics about heartbroken, foolish men, particularly involving the word "fool"
 An upbeat rhythm called the "Doobie Bounce".

Ryznar and co. have argued that many artists sometimes associated with yacht rock, particularly the folk-driven soft rock of Gordon Lightfoot and the Eagles, fall outside the scope of the term as originally conceived. They have also disputed the use of the term as an umbrella for any song whose lyrics include nautical references.

Origins
The socio-political and economic changes that contributed to the emergence of the genre have recently been described by journalists like Steven Orlofsky, and by documentary-film maker Katie Puckrik. Orlofsky pointed out that some contemporaneous pop groups such as Fleetwood Mac, Steely Dan and Supertramp were well-respected by critics and listeners. Yacht rock was art "untouched by the outside world." By contrast to what followed, this "was probably the last major era of pop music wholly separated from the politics of its day." Yacht rock represented an "introspective individualism" that emerged after the death of the "mass-movement idealism" of the 1960s. Its "reassuringly vague escapism" was boosted by the rise of FM radio which brought together two consequences of gender emancipation: women who controlled household spending and men who "felt freer to convey their emotions in song".

The roots of yacht rock can be traced to the music of the Beach Boys, whose aesthetic was the first to be "scavenged" by acts like Rupert Holmes, according to Jacobins Dan O'Sullivan. Captain & Tennille, who were members of the Beach Boys' live band, won "yacht rock's first Best Record Grammy" in 1975, for "Love Will Keep Us Together," a song that composer Neil Sedaka acknowledged was inspired in part by a Beach Boys riff. O'Sullivan also cites the Beach Boys' recording of "Sloop John B" (1966) as the origin of yacht rock's predilection for the "sailors and beachgoers" aesthetic that was "lifted by everyone, from Christopher Cross to Eric Carmen, from 'Buffalo Springfield' folksters like Jim Messina to 'Philly Sound' rockers like Hall & Oates."

Some of the most popular yacht rock acts (who also collaborated on each other's records) included Michael McDonald, Kenny Loggins, Steely Dan and Toto.

Resurgence 
Recent positive reappraisals of the genre have appeared in The Guardian, The Week, and on BBC Four, which broadcast Puckrik's two-part documentary, I Can Go for That: The Smooth World of Yacht Rock, in June 2019. (That documentary is a play on the 1981 Hall & Oates song "I Can't Go for That (No Can Do).")

Orlofsky has argued that the genre's resurgence is partly due to its function as an antidote to the negativity of the Trump era in the US just as in its original context, when yacht rock created "the perfect soundtrack for listeners trying to ignore Watergate and Vietnam", it now again represents "a defiant, fingers-planted-firmly-within-ears disregard of any and all political unrest."

New yacht rock bands such as Young Gun Silver Fox have garnered popularity and media recognition in recent years. Glide magazine describes Young Gun Silver Fox's album AM Waves as having "its brand of 70’s SoCal-infused pop rock" and compares it to the likes of other yacht rock bands such as Ambrosia and the Doobie Brothers. S. Victor Aaron of Something Else! reviews described their Rolling Back album as "as another fine example of the neo-yacht rock that YGSF has absolutely mastered." While Something Else! reviews consider Young Gun Silver Fox to fall under the category of "neo-yacht rock," Talia Woodridge of The Spill Magazine classifies Young Gun Silver as a yacht rock band.

Reception and legacy

Perspectives 
A 2012 Jacobin article described yacht rock as "endlessly banal, melodic and inoffensive, fit to be piped into Macy's changing rooms". The article describes the popularity of yacht rock as reflective of a regressive Reagan-era American society and "about the garden of nightmares America had become". According to the Jacobin article, yacht rock served as "an escape from blunt truths" about sociopolitical issues of the day. In an article in The New Inquiry, music scholar J. Temperance stated that yacht rock "sterilized the form of its soul and blues elements and instead emphasized disinterested, intentionally trite lyrical themes". In a uDiscovermusic article, Paul Sexton expressed how yacht rock as a genre seemed to "exude privileged opulence: of days in expensive recording studios followed by hedonistic trips on private yachts."  According to writer Max McKenna in a 2018 Popmatters article, the lack of political messaging in the yacht rock genre is a "conservative gesture(s) flying under the radar in a climate of poptimist reappraisal."

In response to the Jacobin article, music scholar J. Temperance wrote in The New Inquiry that, rather being a reactionary genre, yacht rock was essential to the growth of pop music in a time of "cultural darkness", "serving as a dialectical pole to progressive rock as well as to punk, postpunk and even proto-postpunk, spurring drastic retrenchments". J. Temperance attributed the "smooth" sound that is characteristic of yacht rock to an indifferent approach to capitalist culture and a "regressive tolerance of allegedly transgressive music with a truly liberatory anality" by using existing symbols rather than create new anti-establishment symbols that are eventually added into the establishment symbols. The New Inquiry article describes the role of yacht rock as a genre that would help people differentiate music appreciation from status by using common symbols and "rendering the popular into the smooth."

Yacht rock has also faced racial criticism, given the genre's associations with "the revival of white rock forms" as writer Max McKenna stated in the 2018 Popmatters article. Wesley Morris compares in a New York Times op-ed piece the recognition given to black artists and white artists that possess the "absurd" quality of blackness in their music. Due to its perceived lack of political involvement and borrowed elements from black music genres, yacht rock has garnered the perception of racial ignorance amongst certain critics of the genre. The Jacobin article described Michael McDonald, a musician well known within the genre of yacht rock, as a "bleached, blue-eyed soul cracker".

Yacht rock is listed as a genre on Spotify, Amazon Music, AccuRadio, and Pandora. Since 2015, there has been a "Yacht Rock" channel on Sirius XM Satellite Radio.  The channel reverts to the off-season channel after summer, but is available year-round on the SXM app. iHeartRadio also has a dedicated "Yacht Rock Radio" station that airs this format 24/7 on its website and app.

Twenty-first century musicians have formed cover bands centered on the yacht rock idea, such as Yacht Rock Revue, which has done national tours. The band hosts an annual Yacht Rock Revival concert where they invite members of the original bands that they cover to join them on stage for a few songs, including Walter Egan, Robbie Dupree, Peter Beckett (Player), Bobby Kimball (former lead singer of Toto), Jeff Carlisi (.38 Special), Bill Champlin (Chicago), and Denny Laine (Wings).

In 2018, Jawbone Press released The Yacht Rock Book: The Oral History of the Soft, Smooth Sounds of the 70s and 80s by author Greg Prato, which explored the entire history of the genre. The book featured a foreword by Fred Armisen, and interviews with Christopher Cross, Kenny Loggins, and John Oates, among others.

Inspired music
Yacht rock bears strong similarities to the Japanese genre of city pop in that they both peaked in the early 1980s, featured jazz and R&B influences arranged and produced by elites in their fields, and gained newfound popularity in the 2010s through the Internet. The link between city pop and yacht rock was made explicit in 1984 when Tatsuro Yamashita, one of Japan's most influential city pop artists and producers, traveled to California to record the album Big Wave, a mix of Beach Boys covers and original English-language compositions written in collaboration with Alan O'Day.

Yacht rock had some influence on the creation of progressive rock, punk rock, postpunk, and proto-postpunk.

Elements of yacht rock have been adopted by new acts such as Vampire Weekend, Foxygen, and Carly Rae Jepsen while the vaporwave genre of electronic music, which began in the 2010s, appropriated the "nautical iconography" of yacht rock.

The 2017 album by Thundercat, Drunk, featured a song that included guest vocalists Kenny Loggins and Michael McDonald, entitled "Show You the Way" (all performed the song together on an episode of The Tonight Show Starring Jimmy Fallon the same year).

The band Sugar Ray's 2019 album Little Yachty is a conscious homage to yacht rock; it includes a cover of the 1979 Rupert Holmes song "Escape (The Piña Colada Song)", which lead singer Mark McGrath has called "the torch bearer of all things yacht rock".

See also
List of yacht rock artists
Culture of California
Jazz rock
Smooth soul
Blue-eyed soul
Tropical rock

References

External links
Yacht or Nyacht – list of bonafide yacht rock songs as evaluated by the creators of Yacht Rock. Songs rated 50 and above are Yacht Rock, songs rated 49.99 and below are nyacht. 
Yacht Rock Radio on Sirius XM

Soft rock
2005 introductions
2005 neologisms
1970s in music
1980s in music
American rock music genres
American styles of music